The 2013–14 Monmouth Hawks men's basketball team represented Monmouth University during the 2013–14 NCAA Division I men's basketball season. The Hawks, led by third year head coach King Rice, played their home games at the Multipurpose Activity Center. This was their first year as members of the Metro Atlantic Athletic Conference after previously being members of the Northeast Conference from 1985–2012. They finished the season 11–21, 5–15 in MAAC play to finish in ninth place. They lost in the first round of the MAAC tournament to Rider.

Roster

Schedule

|-
! colspan="9" style="background:#002245; color:#fff;"| Exhibition

|-
! colspan="9" style="background:#002245; color:#fff;"| Regular season

|-
! colspan="9" style="background:#002245; color:#fff;"| 2014 MAAC tournament

References

Monmouth Hawks men's basketball seasons
Monmouth